This is a list of the tlatoque of the pre-Columbian era altepetl of Tlatelolco.

Pre-Hispanic rulers

Colonial rulers

See also
List of rulers of Tenochtitlan
List of rulers of Tetzcoco
Family tree of Aztec monarchs
Aztec Empire

Notes

References

 01
Tlatelolco
Rulers
Tlatelolco
Indigenous leaders of the Americas